Defenders of Dynatron City is a video game released for the Nintendo Entertainment System by JVC Musical Industries and Lucasfilm Games (later, LucasArts) in August 1992.  The designer of the game was Gary Winnick. This was Winnick's first project as sole designer.  He was previously the co-designer of Maniac Mansion, alongside Ron Gilbert. It was supported by a short-lived media franchise consisting of an animated TV pilot and a six-issues comic book series.

Video game 
The game centers on a team of superheroes who protect a futuristic metropolis from Dr. Mayhem and his robotic henchmen. The Defenders are:
 Ms. Megawatt (voiced by Whoopi Goldberg in the animated special), who can generate electrical energies.
 Jet Headstrong (voiced by Pat Fraley in the animated special), who can fire his head like a rocket. 
 Buzzsaw Girl (voiced by Candi Milo in the animated special), who has a buzzsaw blade instead of legs and feet. 
 Toolbox (voiced by David Coburn in the animated special), a robot with a smashing hammer head and a litany of useful tool options he can use in combat. 
 Monkey Kid (voiced by Brian Stokes Mitchell in the animated special), a blue monkey armed with exploding bananas and leader of the team. 
 Radium Dog, who can fly and has jaws strong enough to pick up cars with his mouth.

Critical response
The game won praise in its preproduction by many video game magazines for the creation of an original superhero team. However, when the game was released it was widely panned by video game critics for, among other things, having a notoriously poor hit detection that required extremely precise aim for attacks to hit enemies.

TV special
The animated pilot was produced by DIC Animation City and was aired on the Fox Kids block on February 22, 1992. It featured the voices of Whoopi Goldberg and Tim Curry. Originally, Doctor Mayhem was voiced by Christopher Walken. Steve Purcell recalled that the producers at the last minute replaced him with a more cartooney voice. It failed to be picked up as a series, but was subsequently released on VHS. No DVD or digital download release has surfaced as of yet.

Comics
The comic book adaptation was published Marvel Comics. Written by Steve Purcell and penciled by Frank Cirocco, it ran for six monthly issues, dated from February through July 1992.

References

External links
 
GameFAQs

1992 video games
LucasArts games
North America-exclusive video games
Nintendo Entertainment System games
Nintendo Entertainment System-only games
Science fiction video games
Superhero teams
Television pilots not picked up as a series
Video games adapted into comics
Video games developed in the United States
Video games scored by George Sanger